Year 259 (CCLIX) was a common year starting on Saturday (link will display the full calendar) of the Julian calendar. At the time, it was known as the Year of the Consulship of Aemilianus and Bassus (or, less frequently, year 1012 Ab urbe condita). The denomination 259 for this year has been used since the early medieval period, when the Anno Domini calendar era became the prevalent method in Europe for naming years.

Events

By place

Roman Empire 
 Emperor Valerian leads an army (70,000 men) to relieve Edessa, besieged by the forces of Persian King Shapur I. An outbreak of a plague kills many legionaries, weakening the Roman position in Syria.
 Battle of Mediolanum: A Germanic confederation, the Alamanni (300,000 warriors), who crossed the Alps, are defeated by Roman legions under Gallienus, near Mediolanum (modern Milan). 
 Postumus revolts against Gallienus in Gaul. The western provinces of Britain and Spain join his independent realm—which is called in modern times the Gallic Empire.
 Postumus, governor of Gaul, declares himself Emperor, and continues to rule the Gallic Empire until 269, when he is killed by his soldiers.
 The Roman fort of Wiesbaden (Germany) is captured by the Alamanni (possibly 260).
 The Franks, who invaded the Roman Empire near Cologne in 257, reach Tarraco in Hispania.

Persia 
 Mesopotamia: Odaenathus, the ruler of the kingdom of Palmyra, sacks the city of Nehardea, destroying its great yeshiva.

By topic

Religion 
 Pope Dionysius is elected as the pope.

Births 
 Hui of Jin, Chinese emperor of the Jin Dynasty (d. 307)
 Tao Kan (or Shixing), Chinese general and politician (d. 334) 
 Yang Zhi, Chinese empress of the Jin Dynasty (d. 292)

Deaths 
 January 10 – Polyeuctus, Roman soldier and saint
 January 18 – Sun Chen, Chinese general and regent (b. 232)
 Augurius of Tarragona, Christian Hispano-Roman clergyman
 Cao Jun (or Zi'an), Chinese prince and son of Cao Cao
 Fructuosus of Tarragona, Christian bishop, martyr and saint
 Wang Chang (or Wenshu), Chinese general and politician

References